Jason Carter may refer to:
Jason Carter (actor) (born 1960), English actor
Jason Carter (Australian footballer) (born 2000), Australian rules footballer for Fremantle FC
Jason Carter (gridiron football) (born 1982), American football player
Jason Carter (fiddler)
Jason Carter (politician) (born 1975), state senator of Georgia and grandson of former U.S. President Jimmy Carter
Jason Carter (Little House), fictional character